Nihiru, or Nikia, is one of the Tuamotu atolls in French Polynesia. It is a relatively small atoll located 49 km to the east of Makemo Atoll and 30 km northeast of Marutea Atoll.

Nihiru Atoll is roughly triangular in shape. It measures 14 km in length with a maximum width of 10.5 km. Its lagoon has an area of 79 km2.

Nihiru had 11 inhabitants in 2012, most of whom originated from Taenga.

History
The first recorded European to arrive to Nihiru was Russian oceanic explorer Fabian Gottlieb von Bellingshausen in 1820 on ships Vostok and Mirni. He named this atoll "Nigeri".

Administration
Nihiru Atoll belongs to the commune of Makemo, which consists of the atolls of Makemo, Haraiki, Marutea Nord, Katiu, Tuanake, Hiti, Tepoto Sud, Raroia, Takume, Taenga and Nihiru.

References

Atoll names
Bellingshausen
Macrobenthic species in lagoons

External links
Atoll list (in French)

Atolls of the Tuamotus